Alesa Nazareno Dolino (born 26 October 1992) is a Filipino women's international footballer who plays as a defender. She is a member of the Philippines women's national football team. She was part of the team at the 2015 AFF Women's Championship and 2016 AFF Women's Championship. She played for the collegiate team of the Far Eastern University (FEU) in Philippines. With FEU she won the 2015 PFF Women's Cup and scored two goals including one at the final and became the best player overall and Best Defender/MVP of the championships.

After graduating from FEU in 2016, Dolino joined OutKast F.C. which participated in the inaugural season of the PFF Women's League.

Dolino was also part of the Philippines' 2018 AFC Women's Asian Cup squad.

International goals

Awards
 2015 PFF Women's Cup - Best player
 2015 PFF Women's Cup - Best Defender/MVP

References

1992 births
Living people
Filipino women's footballers
Philippines women's international footballers
Place of birth missing (living people)
Women's association football defenders
Far Eastern University alumni
University Athletic Association of the Philippines footballers
Competitors at the 2017 Southeast Asian Games
Competitors at the 2019 Southeast Asian Games
Southeast Asian Games competitors for the Philippines